Brownsville is a village in Dodge County, Wisconsin, United States. The population was 581 at the 2010 census.

History
Brownsville was founded around 1878. The village was first known as Thetis Station and had a narrow gauge railroad connection to Fond du Lac and Iron Ridge. The Lutheran church was located next to the cemetery. 
On Tuesday August 28, 2018, an EF1 tornado caused major damage in the village including trees being uprooted, siding being torn off, roof damage, and power lines down. The village was put under a state of emergency, with only residents being allowed in days after the twister.

Geography

Brownsville is located two miles from US Hwy 41 and Wisconsin Highway 175. Wisconsin Highway 49 runs through the village.

Kummel Creek, a tributary of the Rock River, begins just north of the village and flows through the village.

Demographics

2010 census
As of the census of 2010, there were 581 people, 221 households, and 175 families living in the village. The racial makeup of the village was 98.6% White, 0.3% African American, 0.3% Native American, 0.3% Asian, and 0.3% Pacific Islander. Hispanic or Latino of any race were 0.5% of the population.

There were 221 households, of which 37.6% had children under the age of 18 living with them, 70.1% were married couples living together, 7.2% had a female householder with no husband present, 1.8% had a male householder with no wife present, and 20.8% were non-families. 18.6% of all households were made up of individuals, and 5.9% had someone living alone who was 65 years of age or older. The average household size was 2.63 and the average family size was 2.99.

The median age in the village was 40.1 years. 25% of residents were under the age of 18; 7.9% were between the ages of 18 and 24; 25.4% were from 25 to 44; 30.6% were from 45 to 64; and 11% were 65 years of age or older. The gender makeup of the village was 50.6% male and 49.4% female.

2000 census
As of the census of 2000, there were 570 people, 209 households, and 166 families living in the village. The population density was 1,467.3 people per square mile (564.3/km2). There were 213 housing units at an average density of 548.3 per square mile (210.9/km2). The racial makeup of the village was 99.30% White, 0.18% from other races, and 0.53% from two or more races. Hispanic or Latino of any race were 0.35% of the population.

There were 209 households, out of which 37.8% had children under the age of 18 living with them, 73.2% were married couples living together, 4.3% had a female householder with no husband present, and 20.1% were non-families. 17.7% of all households were made up of individuals, and 7.2% had someone living alone who was 65 years of age or older. The average household size was 2.73 and the average family size was 3.11.

In the village, the population was spread out, with 26.7% under the age of 18, 7.5% from 18 to 24, 33.7% from 25 to 44, 20.9% from 45 to 64, and 11.2% who were 65 years of age or older. The median age was 36 years. For every 100 females, there were 104.3 males. For every 100 females age 18 and over, there were 100.0 males.

The median income for a household in the village was $62,679, and the median income for a family was $65,441. Males had a median income of $40,625 versus $26,071 for females. The per capita income for the village was $22,452. None of the population or families were below the poverty line.

Businesses
Michels Corporation has its corporate headquarters in Brownsville.

References

External links

 Brownsville, Wisconsin Public Library

Villages in Wisconsin
Villages in Dodge County, Wisconsin
Populated places established in 1878
1878 establishments in Wisconsin